Charles Granger (born August 9, 1938) is a former American football offensive tackle in the National Football League for the Dallas Cowboys and St. Louis Cardinals. He played college football at Southern University.

Early years
Granger attended Booker T. Washington High School. He accepted a football scholarship from Southern University.

As a sophomore, he became a starter as a two-way lineman midway through the season. As a senior, he contributed to the team winning the 1960 Black College National Championship. In track, he competed in the shot put and discus throw.

In 2010, he was inducted into the Southwestern Athletic Conference Hall of Fame. In 2011, he was inducted into the Southern University Sports Hall of Fame.

Professional career
Granger was selected by the Boston Patriots in 26th round (203rd overall) of the 1961 AFL Draft. In July, he signed as an undrafted free agent with the Dallas Cowboys in the National Football League. He appeared in 8 games with 7 starts at right tackle.

In November 1961, he was acquired by the St. Louis Cardinals. He appeared in 6 games with one start. He was released in 1962.

Personal life
After leaving the National Football League, he was a head coach and general manager of the semi-professional football teams Baton Rouge Red Wings and the Baton Rouge Golden Eagles. He had a 28-4 winning record and won three Dixie Football League championships in four seasons.

References

1938 births
Living people
American football tackles
Players of American football from Louisiana
Dallas Cowboys players
St. Louis Cardinals (football) players
Southern Jaguars football players
Sportspeople from Lake Charles, Louisiana